RUTACA Airlines Flight 225(5R225/RUC225) was a domestic tourist passenger flight, operated by Venezuelan-airliner RUTACA Airlines from Canaima Airport to Santiago Mariño Caribbean International Airport that crashed during a refueling stop in Tomás de Heres Airport in Ciudad Bolívar, Venezuela on 25 January 2001. The aircraft was carrying 24 passengers and crewmembers. The aircraft involved in the crash, a Douglas DC-3, crashed into a shantytown shortly after take off from Ciudad Bolívar, killing everyone on board. Eyewitnesses stated that an engine failure had occurred.

Flight
The flight took off from Canaima Airport in Canaima to the Caribbean Island of Isla Margarita with a refueling stop in Ciudad Bolívar. The aircraft was carrying 20 passengers and 4 crew members, piloted by Captain Ángel López and  co-piloted by Captain Walter Manríquez.

Shortly after taking off from Tomás de Heres Airport, the aircraft suddenly lost altitude and the crew attempted to return to the airport. Witnesses recalled that one engines appeared to be on fire. The aircraft crashed into a large tree and split into two then exploded on impact, with debris raining down on the shantytown of Abobo. One of the wings  came off the main body and crashed onto homes. All 20 passengers and 4 crew members were killed in the crash.  Firefighters were rushed onto the scene and rescue services were immediately deployed to help the injured. At least 3 people were injured, identified as a mother and two of her children, whose all suffered 80% burn on their bodies. One person on the ground was killed during the impact.

Aircraft
The aircraft involved was a Douglas DC-3 manufactured in 1943, which was initially operated for the USAF, under the registration of NC68221. It was then sold to the Brazilian Air Force, was in service with the Air Force until 1975, when it was sold to Rico Linhas Aereas, re-registered as PT-KXR. In 1983 it was bought by RUTACA Airlines and was re-registered as YV-224C.

Passengers and crews
The aircraft was carrying 20 passengers and 4 crew members. Most of the 20 passengers on board were European tourists, according to Venezuela's Air Rescue Service. The government released a list of nationalities of the victims on board the flight. According to the list, there were five Dutch, four Italians, two Hungarians, two Venezuelans and one Austrian. The list also confirmed 3 Americans on board. Jason Shawn Hall from Palatka Fl. was one of the Americans on board. There were conflicting reports whether 3 Canadians were on board the flight. The three Canadians were later confirmed to be on board the aircraft. All 4 crew members were Venezuelans. The Dutch embassy confirmed that there were 5 Dutch on board the aircraft, and stated that they would assist Venezuelan authorities with the identification of the victims.

There were unconfirmed reports that a 25th person may have been on board the flight.

The pilot of the flight was identified as Captain Ángel López and the co-pilot was identified as Captain Walter Manríquez. The Engineer of Flight 225 was identified as José Olivares.

Investigation
An air traffic controller at the airport claimed that the pilot of the aircraft had requested for a return to base, but he did not say why and did not announce an emergency. During its attempt, it crashed onto the shantytown. Locals stated that an engine of the plane was on fire, which raised a question on the condition of the engine. According to the brother of the pilot on board, the pilot had complained in recent weeks that he had made at least four emergency landings because of engine trouble with the aircraft. However, the President of RUTACA, Eugenio Molina, denied such claims, stating that the aircraft had a clean safety record since Rutaca first used it in 1977 and that there had been no recent forced landings.

The aircraft was not equipped with any flight recorders.

This incident marked the end of the DC-3 era in Venezuela when the next day the INAC ordered to suspend the operation of every DC-3 in the country and ordered an immediate inspection on the aircraft. They also ordered RUTACA Airlines to suspend its operations while the authorities performed a rigorous inspection of all its equipment and personnel, being delayed several weeks later. Near the crash site, a monument in honor of the victims, raised by order of the Government of the Bolivar State in 2005, was erected.

See also
 Conviasa Flight 2350

References

External links
 Rutaca Airlines Flight 225, Aviation Safety Network
 Video of the crash site from Associated Press Archive

Aviation accidents and incidents in Venezuela
Accidents and incidents involving the Douglas DC-3
Airliner accidents and incidents caused by engine failure
2001 in Venezuela
Ciudad Bolívar